Yu Tae-gyeong (born 27 August 1961) is a South Korean middle-distance runner. He competed in the men's 4 × 400 metres relay at the 1988 Summer Olympics.

References

1961 births
Living people
Athletes (track and field) at the 1988 Summer Olympics
South Korean male sprinters
South Korean male middle-distance runners
Olympic athletes of South Korea
Place of birth missing (living people)
Asian Games medalists in athletics (track and field)
Asian Games silver medalists for South Korea
Athletes (track and field) at the 1986 Asian Games
Athletes (track and field) at the 1990 Asian Games
Medalists at the 1986 Asian Games
Medalists at the 1990 Asian Games
20th-century South Korean people